Paisley Currah is political scientist and author, known for his work on the transgender rights movement. His book, Sex Is as Sex Does: Governing Transgender Identity (NYU Press, 2022) examines the politics of sex classification in the United States. He is a professor of political science and women's and gender studies at Brooklyn College and the Graduate Center of the City University of New York. He was born in Ontario, Canada, received a B.A. (Hons, First Class) from Queen's University at Kingston, Ontario and an M.A and Ph.D. in Government from Cornell University. He lives in Brooklyn.

Research
Currah writes about transgender people and the law and is a leading authority on the politics of sex classification.  He is the founding editor, with Susan Stryker, of TSQ: Transgender Studies Quarterly, the first non-medical academic journal devoted to transgender issues, which began publication in 2014. When the journal first launched, Currah told Inside Higher Education: "Starting the journal was exciting but kind of daunting. For a long time, there have been a lot of articles and book-length treatments of transgender topics. One of the ideas behind TSQ was to draw readers' attention to how much work there is being done in the field." Currah is now editor emeritus of TSQ.

Currah's book, Sex Is as Sex Does: Governing Transgender Identity, reveals the hidden logics that have governed sex classification policies in the United States and shows what the regulation of transgender identity can tell us about society’s approach to sex and gender writ large. In 2021, an article summarizing some of the book's main arguments, "The Work that Sex Does", was published in a collection, Intimate States: Gender, Sexuality, and Governance in Modern U.S. History, edited by Margot Canaday, Nancy F. Cott, and Robert O. Self and published by the University of Chicago Press. He co-edited, with Shannon Minter and Richard Juang, Transgender Rights, (Minnesota University Press, 2006) which won the Sylvia Rivera Award in Transgender Studies and was a finalist for the 2007 Lambda Literary Awards in the Transgender category. With Monica J. Casper, Currah co-edited Corpus: An Interdisciplinary Reader on Bodies and Knowledge, (Palgrave, 2011). Currah is a recipient of the Wayne F. Placek Award from the American Psychological Foundation.

Public policy and transgender rights advocacy
As a founding board member of the Transgender Law and Policy Institute, Currah has advocated for transgender rights at all levels of government. He also served on the board of directors Global Action for Trans Equality (GATE) from 2011-2017. He served on the advisory board of Human Rights Watch Lesbian, Gay, Bisexual, and Transgender Rights Program. From January 2005-December 2006, he sat on the External Advisory Committee to the New York City Department of Health and Mental Hygiene for the Amendment of Birth Certificates for Transgender Persons.  From November 2004 to December 2005, he served on the Citizen's Advisory Committee Transgender Subcommittee, New York City Human Resources Administration and in that capacity was a co-author of "Recommended Best Practices for Working With and Serving Transgender and Gender Non-Conforming Employees and Clients." He was a co-founder of the New York Association for Gender Rights Advocacy, and helped draft the legislation to amend the New York City Human Rights Law to include discrimination based on gender identity and gender expression.

Currah is often interviewed in the mainstream media, including a story on Elliot Page in Time Magazine in which he discussed "visibility gaps" faced by transmasculine people in the media, and on NPR's 1A after the Supreme Court's 2020 Bostock decision. He also wrote about that decision for the Boston Review. In 2015, he talked to Time magazine about transgender naming practices and his decision to keep his birth-assigned first name, explaining that its rarity during his childhood rendered the name non-gender specific.

Academic affiliations
Currah is professor of political science and women's & gender studies at Brooklyn College and the Graduate Center of the City University of New York.  He served as the chair of the Department of Political Science from 2011-2014.  He served as the Executive Director of the Center for Lesbian and Gay Studies at the City University of New York from 2003-2007.  Currah sits on the editorial boards of GLQ: A Journal of Lesbian and Gay Studies, Women's Studies Quarterly, the American Political Science Review, and Polity. His service on advisory boards has included: LGBT Social Science and Public Policy Center at Hunter College;  Sexuality and the Law, Social Science Research Network; International Resource Network, a project hosted at the Center for Lesbian and Gay Studies and funded by the Ford Foundation; the University Consortium on Sexuality Research and Training. He is also an adjunct professor for the Columbia University Institute for the Study of Human Rights.

Selected works
 
 
 
 
 
 
 
 
 
 
  Originally published in

References

External links
 
 Paisley Currah at Brooklyn College
Paisley Currah at the Graduate Center, City University of New York.
Paisley Currah at Columbia's Institute for the Study of Human Rights.

LGBT studies academics
Living people
Year of birth missing (living people)
City University of New York faculty
Canadian academics
Transgender men
Transgender rights activists
Canadian transgender writers
Transgender scientists
American transgender writers
Queen's University at Kingston alumni
Cornell University alumni
Brooklyn College faculty
Writers from Ontario
Transgender academics
Transgender studies academics
Canadian LGBT academics